The Richardson Cup is a hockey competition for the boy's under-15 teams from schools affiliated to the Ulster Branch of the Irish Hockey Association. The trophy is currently held by Friends School Lisburn after a comprehensive 5-0 win over Regent in 2017. This particular Friends team has now won 3 cups in a row: the Ferris Cup, the Bannister Bowl and the Richardson Cup.

Trophy

The Richardson Cup was presented by Mr R Richardson. The trophy has been dominated recently by Banbridge Academy as they had a winning streak of eleven straight wins following their win in 2009-10. This streak finally came to an end in the 2010-11 season with defeat in the quarter-final to Campbell College.

Format

The trophy is competed for through an open draw competition. In 2016-17 seventeen schools entered a team. To qualify to play on a team, boys must be 15 years of age and under on 30 June immediately preceding the season of play.

Finals

1940s

1950s

1960s

1970s

1980s

1990s

2000s

2010s

Sources

External links
 Ulster Branch of Irish Hockey Association

Field hockey competitions in Ulster
1946 establishments in Ireland
Field hockey cup competitions in Ireland